A Cork City Council election was held in Ireland on 23 May 2014 as part of that year's local elections. Thirty-one councillors were elected from a field of 65 candidates for a five-year term of office from six local electoral areas by proportional representation with a single transferable vote.

Having lost several seats in the 2009 local elections within Cork City Fianna Fáil made 4 gains in these local elections. The party gained 1 seat in each of the 3 Cork South Central LEAs, the base of Micheál Martin, and 1 seat in the Cork City North Central LEA on the North Side. Sinn Féin emerged as the second largest party with 8 seats as they made 3 gains on both sides of the river Lee though effectively matched Fianna Fáil in terms of first preference vote share. Fine Gael lost 3 seats to be reduced to 5 seats while their coalition partner, the Labour Party, was obliterated losing all 7 seats. The Anti-Austerity Alliance made 2 gains to return 3 councillors to City Hall and Ted Tynan became the Workers' Party sole elected representative in the State. Independents secured the remaining 4 seats.

Results by party

Results by Electoral Area

Cork City North Central 

.

Cork City North East

Cork City North West

Cork City South Central

Cork City South East

Cork City South West

References

Changes since 2014
† AAA/PBP Cork City North-Central Cllr Mick Barry was elected as a TD for Cork North-Central in the 2016 Irish general election. On 25 April 2016 Fiona Ryan was co-opted to fill the vacancy.
†† On 13 March 2017 Cork City North-Central AAA/PBP Cllr Lil O'Donnell did not join the Solidarity Party and became an Independent.

External links 
 Official website

2014 Irish local elections
2014